The Best There Is may refer to:

Wolverine: The Best There Is
The Best There Is (Dolly Parton album)
The Best There Is (Charley Pride album)
"The Best There Is" Lena Andersson (singer)